Anthrozoology, also known as human–nonhuman-animal studies (HAS), is the subset of ethnobiology that deals with interactions between humans and other animals. It is an interdisciplinary field that overlaps with other disciplines including anthropology, ethnology, medicine, psychology, social work, veterinary medicine, and zoology. A major focus of anthrozoologic research is the quantifying of the positive effects of human–animal relationships on either party and the study of their interactions. It includes scholars from fields such as anthropology, sociology, biology, history and philosophy.

Anthrozoology scholars, such as Pauleen Bennett recognize the lack of scholarly attention given to non-human animals in the past, and to the relationships between human and non-human animals, especially in the light of the magnitude of animal representations, symbols, stories and their actual physical presence in human societies. Rather than a unified approach, the field currently consists of several methods adapted from the several participating disciplines to encompass human–nonhuman animal relationships and occasional efforts to develop sui generis methods.

Areas of study
 The interaction and enhancement within captive animal interactions.
 Affective (emotional) or relational bonds between humans and animals
 Human perceptions and beliefs in respect of other animals
 How some animals fit into human societies
 How these vary between cultures, and change over times
 The study of animal domestication: how and why domestic animals evolved from wild species (paleoanthrozoology)
 Captive zoo animal bonds with keepers
 The social construction of animals and what it means to be animal
 The human–animal bond
 Parallels between human–animal interactions and human–technology interactions
 The symbolism of animals in literature and art
 The history of animal domestication
 The intersections of speciesism, racism, and sexism
 The place of animals in human-occupied spaces
 The religious significance of animals throughout human history
 Exploring the cross-cultural ethical treatment of animals
 The critical evaluation of animal abuse and exploitation
 Mind, self, and personhood in nonhuman animals
 The potential human health benefits of companion animal ownership
 Human-animal hybrids (where each cell has partly human and partly animal genetic contents)
 Human-animal chimeras (where some cells are human and some cells are animal in origin)

Growth of the field 
There are currently 23 college programs in HAS or a related field in the United States, Canada, Great Britain, Germany, Israel and the Netherlands, as well as an additional eight veterinary school programs in North America, and over thirty HAS organizations in the US, Canada, Great Britain, Australia, France, Germany, New Zealand, Israel, Sweden, and Switzerland.

In the UK, the University of Exeter runs an MA in Anthrozoology which explores human–animal interactions from anthropological (cross-cultural) perspectives. Human animal interactions (HAI) involving companion animals are also studied by the Waltham Centre for Pet Nutrition, which partners with the US National Institutes of Health to research HAI in relation to child development and aging.

There are now three primary lists for HAS scholars and students—H-Animal, the Human-Animal Studies listserv, and NILAS, as well as the Critical Animal Studies list.

There are now over a dozen journals covering HAS issues, many of them founded in the last decade, and hundreds of HAS books, most of them published in the last decade (see for example, Humanimalia). Brill, Berg, Johns Hopkins, Purdue, Columbia, Reaktion, Palgrave-Macmillan, University of Minnesota, University of Illinois, and Oxford all offer either a HAS series or a large number of HAS books.

In addition, in 2006, Animals and Society Institute (ASI) began hosting the Human-Animal Studies Fellowship, a six-week program in which pre- and post-doctoral scholars work on a HAS research project at a university under the guidance of host scholars and distance peer scholars. Beginning in 2011, ASI has partnered with Wesleyan Animal Studies, who will be hosting the fellowship in conjunction with ASI. There are also a handful of HAS conferences per year, including those organized by ISAZ and NILAS, and the Minding Animals conference, held in 2009 in Australia. Finally, there are more HAS courses being taught now than ever before. The ASI website lists over 300 courses (primarily in North America, but also including Great Britain, New Zealand, Australia, Germany, and Poland) in 29 disciplines at over 200 colleges and universities, not including over 100 law school courses.

See also

 Animal behavior
 ABMAP
 Animal rights
 Animal studies
 Anthropomorphism
 Birds in culture
 Cognitive ethology
 Companion animal
 Critical animal studies
 Domestication of the horse
 Ethnozoology
 Human–animal bonding
 Human–canine bond
 Intersectionality
 Insects in culture
 Origin of the domestic dog
 Pauleen Bennett
 Service animal
 Social grooming
 Trans-species psychology
 Zooarchaeology

References

External links 
 Animals and Society Institute
 Anthrozoology Research Group
 H-Animal
 Human-Animal Studies listserve
 Humanimalia: a journal of human-animal interface studies
 NILAS

Animal rights
Animal welfare
 
Anthropology
Ethology
Interdisciplinary subfields of sociology
Environmental humanities
Environmental social science
Zoology